Paul Wheatley may refer to:
 Paul Wheatley (footballer) (born 1981), former Australian rules footballer
 Paul Wheatley (geographer) (1921–1999), historical geographer
 Paul Wheatley (priest) (born 1938), Archdeacon of Sherborne
 Crane Technique (musician) (Paul John Wheatley, born 1979), Irish-American musician